Berkan İsmail Kutlu (born 25 January 1998) is a professional footballer who plays as a midfielder for Turkish club Galatasaray. Born in Switzerland, Kutlu represents Turkey internationally.

Club career

After a couple successful amateur season with Monthey, Kutlu signed a contract with Sion on 2 July 2018. Kutlu made his professional debut with FC Sion in a 1–1 Swiss Super League tie with Servette on 24 June 2020.

Alanyaspor
Kutlu signed with Alanyaspor in Turkey on 10 July 2020.

Galatasaray
On 29 July 2021, he signed a 5-year agreement with Galatasaray, starting from the 2021–2022 season.

International career
Kutlu was born in Switzerland and is of Turkish descent. He represented the Turkey national U21 team in a 1–0 2021 European Under-21 Championship qualification win over Andorra U21 on 4 September 2020. He debuted for the senior Turkey national team in a 1–1 2022 FIFA World Cup qualification tie with Norway on 8 October 2021.

References

External links
 
 SFL Profile
 

1998 births
Living people
People from Monthey
Citizens of Turkey through descent
Turkish footballers
Turkey international footballers
Turkey youth international footballers
Swiss men's footballers
Swiss people of Turkish descent
FC Sion players
Alanyaspor footballers
Swiss Super League players
Süper Lig players
Association football midfielders
Galatasaray S.K. footballers
Sportspeople from Valais